Saskia Noort (born 13 April 1967 in Bergen, North Holland) is a Dutch crime-writer and freelance journalist.

She has written articles for the Dutch editions of Marie Claire and Playboy as well as publishing three novels, The Dinner Club published in English in 2007 by Bitter Lemon Press, translated by Paul Vincent and "Back to the Coast" published in English in 2009 by Bitter Lemon Press, translated by Laura Vroomen.

Her third book, New Neighbours was released in May 2006 in the Netherlands and was a bestseller. The rights have been sold to an English publisher.

Selected works
Back to the Coast, 2003
The Dinner Club, 2004
New Neighbours, 2006
 Fever, 2011

External links
 Brief biographical note on Crime.nl 

1967 births
Living people
People from Bergen, North Holland
21st-century Dutch novelists
Dutch journalists
Dutch women novelists
21st-century Dutch women writers